Welliver is a surname. Notable people with the surname include:

Chauncy Welliver (born 1983), American-New Zealand heavyweight boxer
Neil Welliver (1929–2005), American artist
Titus Welliver (born 1961), American actor

English-language surnames